Allan Mackay Findlay  is a British geographer. Findlay, whose specialty is population geography, is Emeritus Professor in the School of Geography and Sustainable Development at the University of St Andrews.

Findlay earned his doctorate from Durham University. He has an h-index of 51.

References

Living people
Academics of the University of St Andrews
Fellows of the Royal Society of Edinburgh
Alumni of Hatfield College, Durham
Year of birth missing (living people)